Al Jazeera Sports Club, is an Egyptian sports club based in Mersa Matruh, Egypt. The club is mainly known for its football team, which currently plays in the Egyptian Second Division, the second-highest league in the Egyptian football league system.

References

Egyptian Second Division
Football clubs in Egypt
Sports clubs in Egypt
Association football clubs established in 2008
2008 establishments in Egypt